Armour of God II: Operation Condor (also known as Operation Condor in the United States and as Superfly in the Philippines) is a 1991 Hong Kong action-adventure film written and directed by Jackie Chan, who also starred in the film. It is the sequel to 1986's Armour of God.

Compared to its predecessor, this film is more akin to the Indiana Jones film series in that it features Chan's character Jackie / Condor ("Asian Hawk" in the U.S. release) battling against a former Nazi to retrieve gold from an abandoned German base deep in the Sahara Desert.

Armour of God II: Operation Condor is followed by the 2012 film CZ12.

Plot
Hong Kong treasure hunter Jackie aka Asian Hawk, is summoned by Duke Scapio at his mansion in Madrid, Spain, where he is told of a story of a German commander named Hans von Ketterling and his regiment burying 240 tons of gold at a secret base deep in the Sahara Desert in Africa before the end of World War II. The 18 soldiers involved in the operation disappeared under mysterious circumstances. By request from the United Nations, Scapio gives Jackie an unofficial mission to locate the base and recover the gold. Aside from acquiring the key to the base, he is partnered with Ada, an expert in African geography. Upon discovery of the gold, Jackie is promised one percent of the treasure, or roughly 2.5 tons of gold.

One night, while snooping around the home of one of the base's caretakers, Jackie meets a young German woman named Elsa, after saving her from a couple of Arab men—Amon and Tasza—who are also searching for the gold. The next day, he goes to a renowned locksmith and learns that the key is intricately designed for use with a special code. After evading an army of black cars chasing him across town, Jackie is asked by Elsa to let her join him and Ada on their expedition, as she is in search of von Ketterling, who was her grandfather. Upon their arrival in the Sahara Desert, the expedition team picks up Momoko, a Japanese woman who is searching for the meaning of death.

Their camp is attacked by black-veiled bandits who kidnap Elsa and Ada. Jackie and Momoko follow the bandits' trail to a slave market, where they save Elsa and Ada from being auctioned off as sex slaves. Meanwhile, the rest of the expedition team is murdered by a group of mercenaries led by a man who uses a wheelchair. After another run-in with Amon and Tasza, Jackie's group returns to their camp to discover their comrades slain, but Momoko recognizes a statue in one of Elsa's grandfather's pictures and leads them to an ancient temple. After bidding Momoko farewell, the trio enters the ruins, where they encounter a band of vicious tribesmen. While running for their lives, they fall through a loose floor of sand into a cavern, which is part of the secret Nazi base.

They discover the mummified remains of Elsa's grandfather and look through his log book, revealing that the 18 soldiers under von Ketterling ingested cyanide pills and died inside the base upon completion of their mission. However, the trio only counts 17 bodies, with one soldier missing. The man who uses the wheelchair—arriving with his mercenaries and holding Momoko hostage—reveals himself as Adolf, the 18th soldier who murdered Elsa's grandfather after the latter made him a paraplegic for refusing to ingest the cyanide. A furious chase ensues between Jackie's group and the mercenaries throughout the base, which ends with the protagonists getting captured. Upon arriving at the vault, Jackie uses the key and a secret code from Elsa's grandfather's dog tag and opens it, revealing the elevator leading to the gold.

Upon their discovery of the gold, the mercenaries turn their backs on Adolf with the intent of keeping the treasure to themselves. Adolf in turn locks in all of the mercenaries, except for two who chase Jackie to an underground wind tunnel. While Jackie battles the two mercenaries, Elsa and Ada flip random switches in the control room, activating the tunnel's turbine fan. As the three men hang on for their lives, Elsa and Ada attempt to switch off the fan, but they accidentally trigger the base's self-destruct sequence. Adolf tells the quartet that they can escape by having the turbine blow them through the ventilation duct, but he decides to stay to atone for his sins. The quartet gathers as much gold as they can, but the wind force only sends their bodies upward to the desert surface above before the base completely caves in.

As the quartet walks across the desert, they once again encounter Amon and Tasza. With their common lack of a water supply, they finally overcome their differences and try to find water in the Sahara desert.

Cast
 Jackie Chan as Jackie, a.k.a. "Asian Hawk" / "Asian Condor"
 Carol Cheng (aka Do Do Cheng) as Ada
 Eva Cobo de Garcia as Elsa
 Shôko Ikeda (池田昌子) as Momoko
 Daniel Mintz as Amon
 Aldo Sambrell as Adolf (as Aldo Brel Sánchez)
 Božidar Smiljanić as Duke Scapio
 Jonathan Isgar as Tasza
 Ken Goodman
 Steve Tartalia
 Vincent Lyn
 Bruce Fontaine

Jackie Chan stunt team
 Benny Lai
 Ken Lo
 Mars

Production
Armour of God II: Operation Condor was filmed primarily in Madrid, Spain, and Morocco. While the opening scenes where Asian Hawk went powered paragliding was shot in Tagaytay over Taal Lake, Cavite, Philippines. The scene where he stole the gem from the cave tribe and escaped by zorbing was shot in Mount Macolod in Cuenca, Batangas.

The hotel scene where Dodo Cheng is in bath towel and other gun fight scenes in Morocco was shot in Hong Kong on a hill overlooking Sha Tin. Four tons of sand was imported from the Middle East and the entire hotel set was set up. Bangladeshi and Indian extras were hired to act as Moroccans.

According to his book I Am Jackie Chan: My Life in Action, while filming the underground base chase scene, Chan was supposed to swing to a platform with a long chain, but he lost balance and fell to the ground face-first, dislocating his sternum.

In a 2013 interview with CBC, Chan said he was impressed being recognized even in remote areas in Africa. While shooting the film in Southern Morocco he said: "When I was in...in Morocco, middle of nowhere in the desert, all the children look at me, just, uh, put the drunken master pose. I said, 'Wow...'"

Release
Armour of God II was released in Hong Kong on 7 February 1991. In the Philippines, the film was released as Superfly by First Films on 4 December. Project A would later be misleadingly re-released by First Films as its sequel Superfly 2 on 17 September 1992.

Box office
Chan said in his biography that the film cost , the most expensive Hong Kong film at the time. In its Hong Kong theatrical release, the film grossed HK$39,048,711. It was Hong Kong's second highest-grossing film of 1991.

It had its North American release in 1997. On 1,523 North American screens on its opening weekend, it grossed US$4,731,751 ($3,088 per screen), on track to a US$10,405,394 final gross.

Critical reception
The film has received mostly positive reviews.

It holds a 71% approval rating on Rotten Tomatoes, based on 34 reviews with an average rating of 6.5/10.

Awards and nominations
 1992 Hong Kong Film Awards
 Nomination: Best Action Choreography

Versions
The film was originally released in Hong Kong in 1991 with a Cantonese soundtrack and a running time of approximately 106 minutes. An uncut export version of the film was released in the United Kingdom by Entertainment in Video. The VHS was released in 1993, and the DVD in 2001.

In 1991, Dimension Films acquired the U.S. rights, but did not release the film theatrically until 1997 under the title Operation Condor, with a newly commissioned English dub/score and 15 minutes deleted from the final cut. This version was released on DVD in 1999.

In 2004, Intercontinental Video Limited released an uncut version in Hong Kong. The DVD is anamorphic and includes the Cantonese-language soundtrack with English subtitles.

In 2020, 88 Films Ltd released the original Hong Kong version and the previously unreleased extended 117 minute version on Blu-ray in the UK.

See also

 Jackie Chan filmography
 List of Hong Kong films

References

External links
 
 
 
 

1991 films
1990s action adventure films
1990s adventure comedy films
1991 comedy films
1991 martial arts films
1990s Cantonese-language films
Films directed by Jackie Chan
Films set in Africa
Films set in deserts
Films set in Madrid
Films set in South America
Films shot in Madrid
Films shot in Morocco
Films shot in the Philippines
Golden Harvest films
Hong Kong action comedy films
Hong Kong martial arts comedy films
Hong Kong martial arts films
Hong Kong sequel films
Kung fu films
Films set in the Sahara
1990s Hong Kong films